Vacerra is a genus of skippers in the family Hesperiidae.

Species
Vacerra bonfilius (Latreille, [1824])
Vacerra caniola (Herrich-Schäffer, 1869)
Vacerra cervara Steinhauser, 1974
Vacerra egla (Hewitson, 1877)
Vacerra evansi Hayward, 1938
Vacerra hermesia (Hewitson, 1870)
Vacerra lachares Godman, [1900]

Former species
Vacerra molla Bell, 1959 - synonymized with Barrolla barroni Evans, 1955

References

External links
Natural History Museum Lepidoptera genus database

Hesperiini
Hesperiidae genera